Marie-Alexis de Castillon de Saint-Victor (13 December 1838 – 5 March 1873) was a French composer.

Life and career
Born in Chartres into an old aristocratic family from Languedoc, his parents initially intended him to pursue a military career. But Castillon gave up plans for professional soldiering in favour of music, which he learned first in his birthplace and then in Paris, studying piano and composition, initially with Charles Delioux. For composition, he attended the classes of Victor Massé and, from 1869, of César Franck at the Paris Conservatoire. Before his studies with Franck, he had completed his Opus 1, a piano quintet, probably inspired by the earlier example of his friend Camille Saint-Saëns. Both the quintet and the later piano quartet Op. 7 follow Schumann's model. He disavowed earlier efforts, including a symphony in F major, which he had written in 1865.

In fragile health at the best of times (volunteering during the War of 1870, he fell ill and was demobilized in 1871), he died of complications from fever in 1873 at age 34. His works include pieces for piano, chamber music, mélodies, a piano concerto, and other orchestral music. He was also active in Parisian musical life, in particular helping to create, in 1871, the Société Nationale de Musique, of which he was the first secretary.

List of compositions

Piano solo
 Fugue in G minor
 Fugues dans le style libre, Op. 2 (1869)
 Suite No. 1, Op. 5 (1867?-69)
I. Canon
II. Scherzo
III. Thème et Variations
IV. Gavotte
V. Marche
 5 Pièces dans le style ancien, Op. 9 (1870)
I. Prélude
II. Sicilienne
III. Sarabande
IV. Air (D major)
V. Fughette
 Suite No. 2, Op. 10 (1870)
I. Ballade
II. Ronde
III. Adagietto (F major)
IV. Fantaisie (D minor)
V. Saltarelle
 6 Valses humoristiques, Op. 11 (1871) (orchestrated by Charles Koechlin)
I. (Liberamente) (E major)
II. (Non troppo vivo) (A major)
III. (Con fantasia) (C minor)
IV. (Comodo) (F major)
V. (Energico) (B major)
VI. (Vivo assai) (E major)
 24 Pensées fugitives (1873)
I. Aveu
II. Minuetto
III. Au bois
IV. Carillon
V. Compliment
VI. Première Mazurka
VII. Causerie
VIII. Fanfare
IX. Scherzo-Valse
X. Regrets
XI. Deuxième Mazurka
XII. Toccata
XIII. Marche des Français
XIV. Au revoir
XV. Feu follet
XVI. Bayadère
XVII. Chanson du cavalier
XVIII. Extase
XIX. Colombine
XX. Les Dragons
XXI. Scherzettino
XXII. Appel du soir
XXIII. Troisième Mazurka
XXIV. Aubade

Chamber
 Piano Quintet, Op. 1 (1863–64)
I. Allegro
II. Scherzo
III. Adagio et final
 String Quartet No. 1, Op. 3, No. 1 (1867) (ded. to Henri Poencet)
I. (Allegro)
II. (Adagio molto lento - Allegro scherzando)
III. (Molto grave - Molto allegro)
 String Quartet No. 2, Op. 3, No. 2 (1867) (unfinished, only Cavatina published)
 Piano Trio No. 1, Op. 4 (1865)
I. Prélude et Andante
II. Scherzo
III. Romance
IV. Finale
 Sonata for violin and piano, Op. 6 (1868) (ded. to Elie-Miriam Delaborde)
I. (Allegro moderato)
II. (Allegro scherzando)
III. (Andante)
IV. (Allegro molto)
 Piano Quartet, Op. 7 (1869) (ded. to Anton Rubinstein)
I. (Larghetto - Allegro deciso - Allegro)
II. (Scherzando)
III. (Larghetto, quasi marcia religiosa)
IV. Finale (Allegro)
 Piano Trio No. 2, Op. 17 (1870-73?)
I. (Allegro moderato)
II. (Allegretto non vivo) (B major)
III. (Scherzando vivace) (G minor)
IV. (Adagio - Allegro con fuoco - Molto expressivo senza rigore)

Concertante
 Piano Concerto, Op. 12 (1871) (ded. to and first performed (in 1872) by Camille Saint-Saëns piano) (also arr. for 2 pianos by Vincent d'Indy)
I. (Allegro moderato)
II. (Molto lento)
III. (Allegro con fuoco)

Orchestra
 Robert Schumann: Trois morceaux, arr. for orchestra (unpublished)
 Marche Scandinave (ded. to Georges Bizet) (unpublished)
 Symphony No. 1 (1865) (unpublished)
 5 Airs de Danse, suite for orchestra (1870) (unpublished)
I. Introduction et Ronde
II. Tempo di Walzer
III. Sicilienne
IV. Menuet
V. Danse guerrière
 Esquisses symphoniques, Op. 15 (1872)
I. Prélude
II. Gavotte
III.  Allegretto
IV. Retour du Prélude et Finale
 Symphony No. 2 (1872) (unfinished)
 Franz Schubert: Impromptu, Op. 90, No. 1, arr. for orchestra (1872) (unpublished)
 3 Pièces dans le style ancien (1873) (orchestration of Nos. 3, 4, and 5 of Op. 9) (unpublished)
I. Sarabande
II. Air
III. Fughette
 Torquato Tasso, Ouverture (unfinished)

Songs
 6 Poésies d'Armand Silvestre, Op. 8 (1868–73) (orchestrated 1920 by Charles Koechlin)
I. Le Bûcher
II. Le Semeur
III. Sonnet mélancolique
IV. La Mer
V. Renouveau
VI. Vendange

Choral
 Paraphrase du Psaume 84, for soloists, choir, and orchestra, on a text by Louis Gallet, Op. 16 (1872)
 Mass (1872) (unfinished)

References

Notes

Sources

External links

1838 births
1873 deaths
19th-century classical composers
19th-century French composers
19th-century French male musicians
People from Chartres
Conservatoire de Paris alumni
French male classical composers
French Romantic composers